The Congressional Ukraine Caucus is a bipartisan caucus of the United States House of Representatives that was announced in June 1997 in Washington, D.C., nearly six years after Ukraine declared its independence.

Its mission is "organize an association of Members of Congress who share a common concern for building stronger bilateral relations between Ukraine and the United States." With the cooperation with the Ukrainian American community, the Caucus serves to lend support for Ukraine, beginning with democratization efforts and market-oriented reforms, and functions as a source of information for Members of Congress regarding events in Ukraine.

Its counterpart in the United States Senate is the Senate Ukraine Caucus, which was established in February 2015.

Members
Since its inception, the Congressional Ukraine Caucus has been composed of members of both the Democratic and Republican Parties.

Leadership
 Marcy Kaptur (D-OH)
 Brian Fitzpatrick (R-PA)
 Mike Quigley (D-IL)
 Andy Harris (R-MD)

Members

 Rep. Ami Bera (D-CA)
 Rep. Gus Bilirakis (R-FL)
 Rep. Jamaal Bowman (D-NY)
 Rep. Brendan Boyle (D-PA)
 Rep. Vern Buchanan (R-FL)
 Rep. Michael Burgess (R-TX)
 Rep. Kat Cammack (R-FL)
 Rep. André Carson (D-IN)
 Rep. Matt Cartwright (D-PA)
 Rep. Sean Casten (D-IL)
 Rep. David Cicilline (D-RI)
 Rep. Steve Cohen (D-TN)
 Rep. Gerry Connolly (D-VA)
 Rep. Jim Costa (D-CA)
 Rep. Joe Courtney (D-CT)
 Rep. Jason Crow (D-CO)
 Rep. Danny Davis (D-IL)
 Rep. Madeleine Dean (D-PA)
 Rep. Rosa DeLauro (D-CT) 
 Rep. Suzan DelBene (D-WA)
 Rep. Debbie Dingell (D-MI)
 Rep. Lloyd Doggett (D-TX)
 Rep. Ruben Gallego (D-AZ)
 Rep. Jaime Herrera Beutler (R-WA)
 Rep. Brian Higgins (D-NY)
 Rep. French Hill (R-AR)
 Rep. Jim Himes (D-CT)
 Rep. Eleanor Holmes Norton (D-DC)
 Rep. Steven Horsford (D-NV)
 Rep. Ronny Jackson (R-TX)
 Rep. Sheila Jackson Lee (D-TX)
 Rep. Hakeem Jeffries (D-NY)
 Rep. Bill Johnson (R-OH)
 Rep. Mondaire Jones (D-NY)
 Rep. David Joyce (R-OH)
 Rep. William Keating (D-MA)
 Rep. Andy Kim (D-NJ)
 Rep. Ron Kind (D-WI)
 Rep. Adam Kinzinger (R-IL)
 Rep. Raja Krishnamoorthi (D-IL)
 Rep. Ann Kuster (D-NH)
 Rep. Doug Lamborn (R-CO) 
 Rep. James Langevin (D-RI)
 Rep. Mike Levin (D-CA)
 Rep. Andy Levin (D-MI) 
 Rep. Nicole Malliotakis (R-NY)   
 Rep. Carolyn Maloney (D-NY)
 Rep. Donald McEachin (D-VA)
 Rep. Cathy McMorris Rodgers (R-WA) 
 Rep. Jerry McNerney (D-CA)
 Rep. Peter Meijer (R-MI)
 Rep. Dan Meuser (R-PA)
 Rep. Kweisi Mfume (D-MD) 
 Rep. Mariannette Miller-Meeks (R-IA)
 Rep. Joe Morelle (D-NY)
 Rep. Seth Moulton (D-MA)
 Rep. Frank Pallone (D-NJ)
 Rep. Bill Pascrell (D-NJ)
 Rep. Nancy Pelosi (D-CA)
 Rep. August Pfluger (R-TX)
 Rep. Dean Phillips (D-MN)
 Rep. Chellie Pingree (D-ME)
 Rep. David Price (D-NC)
 Rep. Tom Reed (R-NY)
 Rep. Kathleen Rice (D-NY)
 Rep. Deborah Ross (D-NC)
 Rep. Bobby Rush (D-IL)
 Rep. Tim Ryan (D-OH)
 Rep. Mary Gay Scanlon (D-PA)
 Rep. Jan Schakowsky (D-IL)
 Rep. Adam Schiff (D-CA)
 Rep. Bobby Scott (D-VA)
 Rep. Brad Sherman (D-CA)
 Rep. Mikie Sherrill (D-NJ)
 Rep. Elissa Slotkin (D-MI)   
 Rep. Adam Smith (D-WA)
 Rep. Chris Smith (R-NJ)
 Rep. Victoria Spartz (R-IN)
 Rep. Haley Stevens (D-MI)
 Rep. Chris Stewart (R-UT)
 Rep. Eric Swalwell (D-CA)
 Rep. Ritchie Torres (D-NY)
 Rep. Lori Trahan (D-MA)
 Rep. Fred Upton (R-MI)
 Rep. Jackie Walorski (R-IN)
 Rep. Debbie Wasserman Schultz (D-FL)
 Rep. Susan Wild (D-PA)
 Rep. Joe Wilson (R-SC)
 Rep. Steve Womack (R-AR)

Relevant legislation
Leaders and members of the Congressional Ukrainian Caucus have worked in the past toward the passing of legislation regarding Ukraine and issues that affect the surrounding region and its constituency in America.  These efforts include, but are not limited to:

114th Congress:
H.Res.50 Calling for the release of Ukrainian fighter pilot Nadiya Savchenko, who was captured by Russian forces in Eastern Ukraine and has been held illegally in a Russian prison since July 2014
H.Res.162 Calling on the President to provide Ukraine with military assistance to defend its sovereignty and territorial integrity
H.Res.348 Supporting the right of the people of Ukraine to freely elect their government and determine their future
H.Res.878 Recognizing the 25th anniversary of Ukraine's act of declaration of independence from the Soviet Union
H.R.5094 Stability and Democracy for Ukraine Act or the STAND for Ukraine Act

113th Congress:
H.Res.447 Supporting the democratic and European aspirations of the people of Ukraine, and their right to choose their own future free of intimidation and fear
H.Res.499 Condemning the violation of Ukrainian sovereignty, independence, and territorial integrity by military forces of the Russian Federation
H.Res.726 Strongly supporting the right of the people of Ukraine to freely determine their future, including their country's relationship with other nations and international organizations, without interference, intimidation, or coercion by other countries
H.Res.758 Strongly condemning the actions of the Russian Federation, under President Vladimir Putin, which has carried out a policy of aggression against neighboring countries aimed at political and economic domination
H.R.4152 Support for the Sovereignty, Integrity, Democracy, and Economic Stability of Ukraine Act of 2014
H.R.5859 Ukraine Freedom Support Act of 2014

See also
 History of Ukraine
 House Baltic Caucus
 Senate Ukraine Caucus
 Ukrainian Congress Committee of America

References



Caucuses of the United States Congress
European-American society
Ukraine–United States relations
Ukrainian-American history
1997 establishments in Washington, D.C.